Doris Fischer-Colbrie is a ceramic artist and former mathematician. She received her Ph.D. in mathematics in 1978 from University of California at Berkeley, where her advisor was H. Blaine Lawson.

Many of her contributions to the theory of minimal surfaces are now considered foundational to the field. In particular, her collaboration with Richard Schoen is a landmark contribution to the interaction of stable minimal surfaces with nonnegative scalar curvature. Her work on unstable minimal surfaces gave the basic tools by which to relate the assumption of finite index to conditions on stable subdomains and total curvature.

After positions at Columbia University and San Diego State University, Fischer-Colbrie left academia to become a ceramic artist. She is married to Schoen, with whom she has two children.

Publication list

References 

20th-century women mathematicians
21st-century women mathematicians
Columbia University faculty
San Diego State University faculty
American women artists
American women academics